Zealand Series is the highest division for men organized by the regional association DBU Sjælland and one of the sixth-highest divisions overall in the Danish football league system. The Zealand Association Football Championship was introduced a week after the association's foundation in 1902 and was played in a cup format until actual league formats organized on a double round-robin basis including promotions and relegations were introduced in 1927 with the highest ranking division being named Mesterrækken (or SBUs Mesterrække to distinguish it from the other regional leagues). At the time of the league's introduction, it was placed at the top of the Danish football league system, but has since been moved to its current status as the sixth best level, below the Denmark Series at the fifth level.

History 
Only one week after the foundation of the second regional football association, Zealand Football Association (SBU), the first tournament between member clubs was started. The first tournament was played in a cup format with the participation of 13 teams and a final match, a tournament format that was kept until 1917. In 1918, the teams started playing a double tournament format (autumn–spring). At the annual general assembly in 1927, the decision of introducing an actual league format for the best member teams was passed, creating the Mesterrækken (SBU level 1) and the A-rækken (SBU level 2) with promotions and relegations in a double year-long format (autumn-spring) under the auspices of the football association. In 1910, no tournament winner was declared. I finale match ended in a tie and a new date for the replay match was not found. Due to World War I, the Danish football tournaments in 1914–1915 were completed with great difficulties and almost ceased to exist - only eight teams participated in the local tournament administrated by SBU.

Despite difficulties with transportation (especially using cars) during World War II, the football tournaments under Sjællands Boldspil-Union in 1940–1942 managed to complete almost without any cancellations, and continued in a reduced format until the end of the war in 1945. Mesterrækken (SBU level 1), Oprykningsrækken (SBU level 2) and A-rækken (SBU level 3) completed the scheduled matches in autumn 1944, but due to restrictions on the usage of trains during Sundays, many cancellations occurred in spring 1945. A wartime crisis tournament was set up instead, where teams played in small (local) regional tournaments and all promotions and relegations were suspended. Immediately following World War II, the Danish Football Association (DBU) annulled the national wartime league tournaments and introduces a new national league structure for the top tree levels (Danmarksturneringen i fodbold) with ten teams in each league. Promotion to the third division went through the top amateur leagues organized by the six regional football associations, at that moment in time located as the fourth level in Danish association football, where each league winner entered play-off matches against the other regional league winners. The highest ranking senior men's league administrated by DBU Zealand was renamed from Mesterrækken to Sjællandsserien, while the league below was renamed from Oprykningsrækken to Mellemrækken, beginning with the 1945/46-season.

As a consequence of the new league restructuring introduced by the national football association for the higher national levels, on 5 September 2014 at a board meeting of the committee the regional association of Zealand decided to adopt a new league structure for their own highest league competition. Starting from the 2015–16-season, the best men's league would be split into two geographically organized groups with 12 teams, where the group winners are each secured a direct promotion spot to Denmark Series, while the runners-up play an additional single match on a neutral field for a third promotion spot to the fourth level in Danish football. The losing team will enter into a play-off match against one of the league runners-up from the other regional associations. Also the Lolland-Falster Series, that have historically always been located at the same level as the Zealand Series, would drop a level and would instead become a feeder league to the Zealand Series with two promotion spots following an agreement made with DBU Lolland-Falster. DBU Lolland-Falster saw the difference in level between the teams in the Lolland-Falster Series and the Denmark Series being too high.

Zealand Championship winners 
Beginning with the 2015–16 season, the two group winners in a given season enters a play-off final match against each other to determine the Zealand Championship (Sjællandsmesterskabet) - both are automatically promoted to the Denmark Series. The runners-up in both group enter a play-off match against each other on a neutral playing field for the right to enter the Denmark Series, while the losing team will get an additional chance by playing one extra play-off match against a league runner-up from another regional association. Teams placing in the bottom are automatically relegated to the Series 1 leagues and Lolland-Falster Series respectively.

SBU's 1. Holdsturnering play-off Finals

A-rækken play-off Finals

A-rækkens Kredsvinderturnering

Mesterskabsrækken

Sjællandsserien

Sjællandsserien SM Final

Footnotes

References 

Denmark
5
Sports leagues established in 1902
1902 establishments in Denmark
Zealand Football Championship